Chrysophora chrysochlora, the Shining leaf chafer beetle, is a species of beetles of the scarab beetle family.

Description
Body is completely shining metallic green with golden reflections. Elytra have a granulate texture. Males are larger than females and show two strong elongate spurs on the hind legs and enlarged tarsal claws.

Distribution
This species can be found in Colombia, Ecuador and Peru.

References
 Biolib
Charles Leonard Hogue  Latin American Insects and Entomology
Coleoptera-Atlas
Luis Carlos Pardo-Locarno and Miguel-Angel Morón Larva and pupa of Chrysophora chrysochlora The Canadian Entomologist

Rutelinae